Pembroke may refer to:

Places

Australia
 Electoral division of Pembroke, an electoral division in Tasmania
 Pembroke Land District, formerly Pembroke County, Tasmania

Bermuda
 Pembroke Parish

Canada
 Pembroke, West Hants, Nova Scotia
 Pembroke, Yarmouth County, Nova Scotia
 Pembroke, Ontario

Republic of Ireland
 Pembroke Township, a former township that is now part of the city of Dublin

Malta
 Pembroke, Malta

New Zealand
 Pembroke, the former name of Wanaka in Central Otago
 Pembroke, New Zealand, a settlement northwest of Stratford, Taranaki

United States
 Pembroke, Georgia
 Pembroke, Indiana
 Pembroke, Kentucky
 Pembroke, Maine
 Pembroke, Massachusetts
 North Pembroke, Massachusetts
 Pembroke, New Hampshire
 Pembroke, New York
 Pembroke, North Carolina
 Pembroke, Virginia
 Pembroke Manor, Virginia, subdivision of Virginia Beach
 Pembroke Park, Florida
 Pembroke Pines, Florida
 Pembroke Township, Kankakee County, Illinois

Wales
 Pembroke, Pembrokeshire, a town in southwest Wales
 Pembroke Dock, a town in southwest Wales
 Pembrokeshire, a county in southwest Wales
 Pembrokeshire Coast National Park, a national park in southwest Wales

Institutions
 Pembroke College, Cambridge
 Pembroke College, Oxford
 Pembroke College in Brown University
 Pembroke School, Adelaide, a school in South Australia
 Pembroke School, Pembrokeshire, Wales
 University of North Carolina at Pembroke
 Pembroke House of Kearsney College in South Africa

Others
 Earl of Pembroke
 Fort Pembroke, a polygonal fort in Malta
 HMS Pembroke, the name of eight ships of the Royal Navy
 Pembroke (novel), an 1894 novel by Mary E. Wilkins Freeman
 Pembroke Battery, a former battery in Malta 
 Pembroke Castle, Wales
 Pembroke cattle
 Pembroke Management, an investment management firm located in Canada
 Pembroke Players, a student drama society at the Cambridge University
 Pembroke Power Station, Wales
 Pembroke RFC, a rugby football club
 Pembroke Welsh Corgi, a breed of dog
 Percival Pembroke, an aircraft